The Independent Social Party of Angola is a political party in Angola. The party was founded on July 27, 1993. The party is a member of the coalition New Democracy. The party was previously a member of the coalition Parties of the Civilian Opposition, but pulled out of it and took part in founding New Democracy in December 2006.

References

Political parties in Angola
Political parties established in 1993
1993 establishments in Angola